Chivor is a town and municipality in the Eastern Boyacá Province, part of the Colombian department of Boyacá. Economic activity includes emerald mining.

Borders 
Bordered to the north with the municipality of Macanal; to the south with Ubalá, Cundinamarca, on the east with the municipality of Santa María, and the west by the municipality of Almeida.

Etymology 
Chivor comes from Chibcha and means "Our farmfields - our mother" or "Green and rich land". The latter refers to the rich emerald deposits.

History 
Chivor was inhabited by the Muisca in the times before the Spanish conquest. The Muisca were organized in their loose Muisca Confederation with northern ruler the zaque of Hunza and the southern zipa in Bacatá. Already in those times the rich emerald deposits were known and mined by the Muisca. The emeralds functioned as offer pieces in the Muisca religion, as decoration and as money.

The emerald deposits of Chivor were discovered by Spanish conquistador Gonzalo Jiménez de Quesada in 1537 but the mines were abandoned until 1886.

Modern Chivor was not founded until December 16, 1930, by Florencio Novoa.

Economy 
Main economical activities of Chivor are agriculture (maize, yuca, bananas, sugarcane, beans, chayote, coffee and fruits such as papayas, blackberries and the typical Colombian fruits lulo and tree tomatoes) and especially the emerald mining. In 2014 emeralds worth 30 million US dollars were extracted in Boyacá. The rich deposits have led to numerous conflicts in the region, including in Chivor. 

Currently the emerald is in Vienna, Austria. Other grand emeralds from Chivor are Patricia weighing 632 carats, and La Magnífica of 1225 carats.

The Embalse la Esmeralda ("Emerald reservoir") producing hydroelectric energy is governed from Chivor, Macanal and Almeida.

Climate
Chivor has a subtropical highland climate (Cfb) with heavy to very heavy rainfall year-round.

Gallery

See also 
 Muzo, another town in Boyacá famous for its emeralds
 Colombian emerald trade
 Colombian Emeralds

References

Further reading

External links 
  Hydroelectric energy Chivor

Municipalities of Boyacá Department
Populated places established in 1930
1930 establishments in Colombia
Muisca Confederation
Muysccubun
Colombian emeralds